The Battle of Antukyah was fought in 1531 between Adal Sultanate forces under Imam Ahmad ibn Ibrahim al-Ghazi and the Abyssinian army under Eslamu.

Despite the care Eslamu took in deploying his men, and the number of them, the Ethiopian army panicked and fled when the Imam's cannons cut down thousands of them. The Futuh al-Habasha compared the number of dead and wounded to the previous Battle of Shimbra Kure.

Notes 

Conflicts in 1531
1531 in Africa
1531 in Ethiopia
Ethiopian Highlands
Antukyah
Antukyah